Events from the year 1865 in Sweden

Incumbents
 Monarch – Charles XV

Events

 Inauguration of the Botaniska trädgården (Lund)
 The first issue of the Jönköpings-Posten.
 The Uppsala högre elementarläroverk för flickor is founded. 
 Foundation of the Valand Academy
 The Rossander Courses for women starts in Stockholm.

Births

 26 January - Axel Wallengren, author, poet and journalist  (died 1896) 
 19 February - Sven Hedin,  geographer, topographer, explorer, photographer, travel writer, and illustrator (died 1952)
 1 March - Elma Danielsson, Social Democrat, journalist and feminist  (died 1936)
 28 August - Hanna Lindberg, milliner, politician, feminist  (died 1951)
 11 December  – Frida Stéenhoff, writer and women's rights activist  (died 1945)
 Anna von Zweigbergk, reporter (died 1952)

Deaths

 Helena Larsdotter Westerlund, educator (born 1799)
 31 December - Fredrika Bremer, writer  (born 1801)

References

 
Years of the 19th century in Sweden
Sweden